The International Congress of Genealogical and Heraldic Sciences is a biennial conference discussing topics of heraldic and genealogical interest. The Congress brings together scholars and other interested persons from all the nations of Europe and from many countries around the world. The first Congress was held in Barcelona in 1929; at the second Congress, held in 1953, it was decided that future meetings would be held every two years (there have been two exceptions).

Memorable 22nd Congress held in Ottawa in 1996 "for the first time beyond the birthplace of modern scientific studies in genealogy and heraldry" had Honourable Roméo LeBlanc, Governor General of Canada and his wife Her Excellency Mrs Diana Fowler LeBlanc as its patrons. The 2006 congress in St. Andrews, had The Princess Royal as its patron, and the 2008 congress in Quebec City had Michaëlle Jean, Governor General of Canada as its patron.

The main themes of the Congresses have changed greatly over the years, and some disciplines have ceased to form any part of the Congresses' study. Abandoned subjects include sphragistics and iconography, which were dealt with at Paris, and vexillology, which was to have been one of the themes at Congresses after Bern. Genetics, which had been a subject of discussion at Stockholm in 1960, did not reappear until the Ottawa Congress of 1996. Chivalric orders were another discarded subject, despite featuring in the congresses held at Rome/Naples, Madrid, Stockholm and Edinburgh, as well as in a few papers presented at Madrid in 1982.

List of congresses 
Over the years the meeting have been held in different cities:

References

Heraldry
Genealogy
Genealogical societies
Recurring events established in 1929